is a 2014 Japanese comedy film directed by Hideki Takeuchi and based on the manga series Thermae Romae by Mari Yamazaki.

Cast
Hiroshi Abe
Aya Ueto
Kazuki Kitamura
Takashi Sasano
Anthony Ripoll

Reception
The film has grossed ¥4.42 billion in Japan.

References

External links

2014 comedy films
Films about time travel
Films set in ancient Rome
Films shot in Bulgaria
Japanese comedy films
Japanese sequel films
Live-action films based on manga
2010s Japanese films